Schweriner SC, also known as SSC Schwerin, is a German sports club based in Schwerin, Mecklenburg-Vorpommern. It is mostly known for its women's volleyball department which plays in the German Volleyball League having won it many times.

Women's volleyball
The team has won many titles including the National Championship and Cup of East Germany, the National Championship (Bundesliga) and Cup of Germany, the CEV Champions League and the CEV Cup Winners Cup (now called CEV Cup).

Previous names
Due to sponsorship, the club have competed under the following names:
 SC Traktor Schwerin (1957–1991)
 Schweriner SC and SSC Schwerin (1991–2016)
 SSC Palmberg Schwerin (2016–present)

Honours

National competitions
  East German Championship: 7
1976, 1977, 1980, 1981, 1982, 1983, 1984

  East German Cup: 4
1981, 1982, 1988, 1990

  German Championship: 11
1995, 1998, 2000, 2001, 2002, 2006, 2009, 2011, 2012, 2013, 2017

  German Cup: 5
2001, 2006, 2007, 2012, 2013

International competitions
  CEV Champions League: 1
1977–78

  Cup Winners Cup: 1
1974–75

Team squad
Season 2018–2019, as of May 2019.

See also
 Germany women's national volleyball team

References

External links
Official Website 
CEV profile

German volleyball clubs
Multi-sport clubs in Germany
1957 establishments in East Germany
Sport in Schwerin
Volleyball clubs established in 1957